Bohman is a surname. Notable people with the surname include:

 Gösta Bohman (1911–1997), Swedish politician
 Hanna Bohman, Canadian model and fighter with the Kurdish YPJ militia
 Lennart Bohman (1909–1979), Swedish Olympic boxer
 Luděk Bohman (born 1946), Czech sprinter
 Ludvík Bohman (born 1973), Czech sprinter
 Martin Bohman (born 1980), Czech Olympic bobsledder
 Mikael Bohman (born 1979), Swedish ice hockey goaltender 
 Tom Bohman, American mathematician

Other uses
 Bohman & Schwartz, defunct automobile manufacturer in the United States